Bozman is an unincorporated community in Talbot County, Maryland, United States. Bozman is located along Maryland Route 579, southwest of St. Michaels.

References

Unincorporated communities in Talbot County, Maryland
Unincorporated communities in Maryland